Stanisław Sylwester Alfonzy Grodyński (baptized Stanisław Sylwester Alfonzy Kusionowicz; 4 November 1898 – 27 August 1971) - lawyer, governor and Polish military intelligence officer.

On 7 September 1906 Stanisław's father, Andrzej Kusionowicz Grodyński, a circuit judge in Polish Silesia, changed the family surname from Kusionowicz to Grodyński (as his brothers Józef and Władysław had done previously). At age seventeen Grodyński was conscripted into the Austrian Army and during World War I (WWI), while serving in Italy, he was wounded by grenade shrapnel. Following the war he graduated from law studies and after assignment with the Polish Ministry of Interior he received appointments as "starost" (governor) of different provinces\cities across Poland which at the time were within politically and militarily important territories, including those now governed by Belarus and Ukraine. When World War II (WWII) hostilities broke out and Germany invaded Poland, Grodyński was the Governor of Grudziądz strategically close to the Prussian border. Following the Battle of Grudziądz the Polish Forces were compelled to retreat and Grodyński was evacuated to Lwów (previously Lemberg now Lviv) where he and his family were subsequently 'arrested' and exiled by the invading Russian Military to a forced labour camp (Gulag) in Eastern Siberia. Surviving the harsh conditions there he was released to join the Polish Armed Forces and served in the command of the independent Polish Division of the Eighth Army in North Africa and at Monte Cassino, his significant role confirmed with his promotion to Captain on 12 June 1946 by Brigadier General Nikodem Sulik. Following the war Grodyński settled along with his re-united family in London and undertook various 'day jobs' while 'unofficially' assisting Poland's exiled leaders in striving to restore Poland's independence. In a book written by his first son, collating the diaries and records of his family, the life story of Stanisław is featured as the leader of "The Grodyński Brigade".

Early & World War I years

Following his father's marriage to Alicja Matter on 3 June 1896, Stanisław was born on 4 November 1898 in Jabłonków (now Jablunkov in the Czech Republic) in the Zaolzie region (at that time occupied by Austria). As a young boy he moved with his parents to Strumień in the Cieszyn District of Sląsk, and then, after the family moved to the town of Cieszyn, Stanisław Grodyński (following his change in surname) lived with his mother and father at 34 Bielska street (formerly Bielitzerstrasse)

At age seventeen Grodyński was called up for military service in the Austrian Army and in May 1916 he began military training as a rifleman in 100 Reserve Battalion of the Infantry Regiment. His next assignment was the Officers School in Opava and after several months he was promoted to the rank of Corporal. In November of that year Grodyński was assigned to 12 Storming Battalion with which he fought in Russia and later he also fought at the Italian front. He was shortly promoted to Sergeant then several months later to Ensign. In January 1918 he was promoted to the rank of Second Lieutenant in the same battalion. Unfortunately, during heavy fighting at the Italian Front, he was wounded in the neck by shrapnel from a hand-grenade and as a result of the injuries he was transported to one of the military hospitals situated in the area. After leaving the hospital, he was assigned as Adjutant at the military hospital in Bielsk (Bielsko-Biała).

Inter-war years

On 12 January 1921, after five years of military service, Grodyński transferred to the 'reserve' as a 'civilian'. After embarking on law studies at the Jagiellonian University, in Kraków, which he completed on 25 July 1923 at the Adam Mickiewicz University, in Poznań, he worked in the Ministry of the Interior in Warsaw. Following his marriage to Halina Bulczyńska he took up a new position in Poznań (Wielkopolska) and after the birth of his first son "Andrzej" on 28 November 1922, Grodyński was posted to Kobryń (now in Belarus) in Polesie. After a temporary assignment in Brest he returned to take up the post of 'Vice-Starost' (Deputy Head of Provincial Government). Grodyński's second son, "Marjan", was born in Kobryń on 3 July 1925 and following his appointment as 'Poviat Starost' (Province Governor) he and his young family moved to Sarny (now in Ukraine) in Wołyń.

Following further appointments as starost in Świecie, Toruń, Ivano-Frankivsk and Kalush (now in Ukraine), in 1937 Grodyński was reassigned to the post of Province\City 'Starost' (Governor) of Grudziądz, in the politically and militarily strategic region of Pomorze. In this nationally important post he worked closely with judges and military commanders, including General Michał Karaszewicz-Tokarzewski and Marshal Edward Rydz-Śmigły, and frequently traveled to Toruń to meet his superior, Voievode Raczkiewicz (the Pomeranian Governor), before the latter became the President of Poland following the start of WWII. The close proximity of East Prussia, the concentration of factories mainly producing goods for export, and in particular, the large percentage of the German minority living in that part of Poland, gave rise to many difficult problems and challenges, such as dealing with marches of striking workers agitated by German agents who received their orders from Berlin. In recognition of his work and devotion to state service, Grodyński was decorated with the Gold Cross of Merit (Poland's then highest civilian award) shortly before the outbreak of war.

World War II years – exile

On 1 September 1939, shortly after military operations commenced, Grodyński drove his family to the railway station in Grudziądz from where they went by train to a previously planned evacuation point near Lublin. Following news that the Polish Army was withdrawing from the western part of the country, Grodyński moved to a second evacuation point in a village on the Polish-Russian border, before he and his family traveled to the city of Lwów where they were eventually arrested and deported by train to a Soviet forced labour camp near the town of Aldan in the Autonomous Soviet Socialist Republic of Yakutsk.

World War II years – military
On that memorable day for exiled Poles in 1941, following the signing of the Polish-Russian Military Agreement (30 July) which granted amnesty to all those surviving in Soviet Russia, Grodyński immediately requested to meet with the NKWD authorities in Ałdan. On reaching Buzułuk Grodyński and his family were assigned to different branches of the military and he then parted from his family to re-commence serving in the ranks of the Polish Army.

After a two week 'working visit' to Moscow, on 25 October Grodyński was assigned to the 6th Polish Army Infantry Division which was being formed in the town of Totskoye in Kazakhstan. The commander of the Division was Brigadier General Michał Karaszewicz-Tokarzewski. On 1 November, Grodyński was appointed Commander of the Headquarters' Platoon, the 17th Infantry Regiment, which he led for nine months. The Commander of the Polish Army in the Soviet Union, General Władysław Anders, visited this Division four times, including the occasion he accompanied General Sikorski during his official visit to Russia in December 1941. After a few months Grodyński left with 17th Headquarters' Platoon to the vicinity of Shahrisabz in Uzbekistan. In August 1942 this Division left Russia by ships from the port of Turkmenbashi (in the Krasnovodsk Gulf of Turkmenistan) on the Caspian Sea to the port of Pahlewi in Persia (now Bandar-e Anzali in Iran). Grodyński continued his military service in Persia, where the Polish Army was transferred under the command of the British. A few months later the entire 6th Division was transported through Hamadan to the territory of Iraq, where all the military units were deployed in the vicinity of the towns of Khanaqin, Quizil-Ribat and Kirkuk. From 18 November to 30 December 1942 Grodyński continued his military service in Iraq as an Officer in Army HQ.

Assigned to Unit II of Army Section Command on 31 December 1942, Grodyński moved from Iraq with 5th Division to Gaza in Palestine. (The dissolution of 6th Infantry Division and merger with 5th Borderland Infantry Division under the sign of the bison, was completed on 11 March 1943.) While there he was visited by his son Marjan, on leave from the famous submarine Sokół, and together they managed to visit Grodyński's wife, Halina, who was working as a Specialist Nurse with the Red Cross in a Polish Hospital near Ismailia in Egypt. The next deployment of the units of 5th Division was in the vicinity of El Qantara. After the Allied Forces began military operations in Italy, with the American Army and British Eighth Army attacking Sicily and the Italian peninsula in September 1943, the Polish Army, commanded by General Władysław Anders, was redeployed to Italy. The 5th Borderland Division, commanded by General Bohusz-Szyszko, was transported by sea from Port Said to Taranto, before 2nd Corps attacked Monte Cassino. During heavy fighting against the German Army, 5th Borderland Infantry Division, commanded by General Nikodem Sulik, were victorious in many battles.

Grodyński’s military service in this period exploited his organizational skills, as well as his intelligence background and multi-lingual skills, for example through the interrogations of German prisoners in Rimini by 2nd Corps Culture and Information Unit. On 2 June 1945, he took part in a ceremony in Rome celebrating the anniversary of Garibaldi's death, during which he represented Polish Armed Forces (pl), along with military leaders of French and other national armed forces. The ending of the Second World War became a devastating experience for Grodyński and all serving Poles who fought integrally with the Allied Forces as political decisions caused much of Eastern Europe, including Poland, to be submitted to Russian authority. These decisions made in spite of the huge losses of the Polish nation and its army and the enormous contribution of the Polish people to eventual victory, conveyed the extent of the post-war betrayal of the allies with regard to Poland’s freedom which in turn robbed many of them the prospect of returning to their 'beloved homeland'.

Post-War years
After he joined the Polish Resettlement Corps, on 28 March 1947, Grodyński made the decision to leave Italy and went by ship to England, arriving at the port of Liverpool. His first place of residence was Polish Military Camp in Chiseldon, near Swindon, in Wiltshire (where after a short stay he became Head of a Polish School created for young Polish soldiers) before moving to London to seek better employment opportunities.

Throughout the post-war period Grodyński maintained contacts with those who came to London and with whom he had worked in Poland or fought with in military campaigns abroad, while endeavouring 'behind the scenes' (given his military intelligence background) to assist the Polish government-in-exile. A back injury sustained in breaking the fall of one of Poland's former Generals with whom, during his later years, he was walking in London, contributed, along with previous wounds and ailing health, to his death.

Personal life
Stanisław, only son of Alicja and Andrzej, was born on 4 November 1898 in Jabłonków (now Jablunkov in the Czech Republic). As with his father and half-brother Bogusław, church records show that Stanisław's surname was changed from Kusionowicz to Grodyński on 7 September 1906. Following military service, then law studies at universities in Kraków and Poznań, he worked for the Ministry of the Interior in Warszawa where he met Halina Bulczyńska whom he married on 25 February 1922.

After moving to a new job in Poznań their first son, Andrzej Sylwester Tadeusz Grodyński, was born. Following assignments in Brest and Kobryn (now in Belarus), where second son Marjan Stanisław Ryszard Grodyński was born, the family moved to Sarny. Grodyński's father Andrzej Grodyński died shortly afterwards on 25 July 1925 and was buried at Cieszyn Municipal Cemetery (pl) after a funeral procession that reflected his local, regional and national standing, with fellow judges, six priests and representatives across all levels of society, including the military. Following further appointments as Starost in the Eastern Borderlands Grodyński was appointed Starost in Grudziądz which was his last posting before his deportation with his wife and young sons to a Soviet labour camp in the Yakutsk region of Siberia. Grodyński's mother Alicja survived WWII, living together with his former 'nanny', Jadwigą Szczypką, at 7 Stanisława Wyspiańskiego street in Cieszyn where Alicja later died on 11 March 1964.

Shortly after Grodyński's move to London, Marjan's wife, "Kicia", gave birth to his first grandchild, "Basia", in May 1949, with brother "Jasiu" arriving in December 1951. On Polish Constitution Day in 1954, Andrzej's wife "Helen" gave birth to his third grandchild "Stasiu", with brother "Rysiu" arriving in November 1955. Grodyński's closest friends in London were Colonel Józef Werobej (pl) and the Lubomirski, Offenkowski and Banks families. In addition to the various employment roles he undertook he was a member of different Polish organizations, including the London Institute of 5th Borderland Infantry Division at which, in September 1966, he attended the twenty-fifth anniversary of the Division during which General Władysław Sikorski was commemorated by General Władysław Anders. On Sunday 3 January 1971 Grodyński participated in an event presenting New Year’s greetings to President August Zaleski in the Polish President's Office in London. Living in Balham, South London, Grodyński was one of the first members of the Polish Catholic Parish and of the White Eagle Club inaugerated in the area.

Following serious deterioration in his physical health, Stanisław SA Grodyński died in St James' Hospital, Balham, on 27 August 1971, and was laid to rest at Streatham Cemetery, Garret Lane, London (Grave 491A, Area A, Block R) where he was later joined by his wife Halina who died in Penley on 6 April 1984.

Honours

Polish honours
  | Gold Cross of Merit {1923}
  | Commemorative Medal for War of 1918-1921 {1928}
  | Medal of the 10th Anniversary of Independence {1928}
  | Silesian Uprising Cross {1946}

  | Medal for Long Service – Bronze 10 Years {1938}
  | Medal for Long Service – Silver 20 Years {1938}

British honours
  || 1939–1945 Star
  || Defence Medal
  || War Medal 1939–1945

References

Bibliography 
 Gwiazdka Cieszyńska ... edition of 13 June 1896 (49#24) recording the marriage of AK and AM in Cieszyn Parish Church
 The beginning of independence (11 November 1918) ... Museum of Józef Piłsudski in Sulejówek, retrieved 19 December 2013 (in Polish)
 Dziennik Śląska Cieszyńskiego ... editions of 26, 30 July 1925 (XXII#161/152-3, 163/159,161) with AG obituary, funeral and tribute details
 Gwiazdka Cieszyńska ... editions of 28, 31 July 1925 (78#58/224, 59/227) noting further AG details and account of funeral procession
 Starosts of Interwar Period 1918-1939 (Słownik biograficzny starostów Drugiej Rzeczypospolitej) ... Janusz Mierzwa, (2018) SG Starost p194/5  (in Polish)
 Kalendarz Grudziądzki 2002 ... Stanisław Poręba, SG Starost 1937-1939 p145-6
 Dziennik Bydgoski ... editions of 6 January 1938, SG appointment as Starost, 18 May 1939 (XXIII#114), SG meeting in Grudziądz with Mayor Józef Włodek (pl), Pomeranian Governor Władysław Raczkiewicz, General Michał Karaszewicz-Tokarzewski and Marshal Edward Rydz-Śmigły (before his appointment as Commander-in-Chief of Polish Forces)
 Biuletyn Grudziądz ... edition of 18 March 2020 noting SG as "last Starost of Grudziądz before outbreak of WWII" p4
 Poland's 1939 Defensive War ... Eugeniusz Kozłowski, Wydawnictwo Ministerstwa Obrony Nradowej, Warszawa 1979.  (in Polish)
 Poland in the Second World War ... Jozef Garlinski, 
 The Pattern of Soviet Domination ... Stanisław Mikolajczyk (Sampson Low, Marston & Co 1948)
 The Fate of Poles in the USSR 1939~1989 Tomasz Piesakowski, 
 Orzeł Biały (White Eagle) ... edition Nr 24 (159) p9 'O Wolność Prawdziwą' (For Real Freedom, June 1945) Stanisław SA Grodyński representing Poland's Armed Forces at allied commemoration in Rome with Garibaldi grandson (full page article including two photos)
 The Polish Resettlement Corps: Organisation of the Corps and Plans for its Employment ... HM Government 1946
 Rzeczpospolita Polska (Republic of Poland) ... London 31 January 1971 - Rok XV NrI (197), front page lead article and photograph of new year celebration of 3 January with President August Zaleski and Prime Minister Zygmunt Muchniewski
 Eugeniusz Lubomirski - Kartki z mego życia ... Polska Fundacja Kulturalna, (1998), with numerous references to cousin, mutual friend and Polish Army Command comrade, Stefan Tyszkiewicz (in Polish)
 The Grodyński Brigade (Brygadą Grodyńskawo) ... 1977/2012 book by Andrzej ST Grodyński with biography of Stanisław on pages 47–77

External links 

 Photos of Relevance to 'The Grodyński Family'
 The Polish National Archives in Kraków
 History and Traditions of Cieszyn
 Stanisław’s Grandfather's Grave
 Silesian Digital Library
 Genealogy Indexer
 Museum of Silesia

1898 births
1971 deaths
People from Silesia
Polish Roman Catholics
Polish lawyers
Recipients of the Gold Cross of Merit (Poland)
20th-century Polish military personnel
Eastern Front (World War I)
Polish deportees to Soviet Union
Polish exiles
Polish military personnel of World War II
Infantry divisions of Poland